Nardo Zalko (October 1, 1941June 2, 2011) was an Argentinian-French journalist, author, researcher, and historian of tango.

Early life

Zalko was born in October 1941 to a Lithuanian Jewish couple, Frida and Abrasha Zalko, who migrated to Argentina. He was raised in the porteño neighbourhood of San Cristobal, Buenos Aires. At 19, Zalko sailed to Israel and joined Kibbutz Ein Shemer. He wrote for the Uruguayan weekly newspaper, Marcha, published in Montevideo, and reported on events for them such as the Eichmann trial held in Jerusalem in 1961.

Zalko was a paratrooper in the Six-Day War of 1967 and fought on the front lines in the Battle of Ammunition Hill in Jerusalem.

Career

Zalko moved to Paris with his wife and three-year-old son in 1970. In 1979, he became a journalist for Agence France-Presse (AFP), where he eventually became the shift manager of the South America department, Desk AmSud. He retired from the AFP as the head of AmSud in 2006.

In 1996, Zalko became editor-in-chief of Tango, Bulletin de l'Académie du Tango de France, a publication that printed rare documents, phonograph records, sheet music, books, pictures, and photographs about tango. Through this work, Zalko interviewed many musicians, singers, and dancers, including Astor Piazzolla and Susana Rinaldi. This collection is now housed in the Centre National de la Danse (CND) in Paris.

In 1998, Zalko published his first book about tango, Paris – Buenos Aires, Un Siècle de Tango (published by ), in which he documented the music, dance, lyrics, and culture of tango, and the relationship it created between the cities of Paris and Buenos Aires. In the book, Zalko argues that tango had to become popular in Paris to eventually experience a revival in its birthplace of Buenos Aires. The book contains 66 illustrations, including rare ones from Zalko's personal collection among them tango poetry, sheet music, postcards, drawings, satirical cartoons and photographs, to complement the text. The book was chosen by the French Ministry of National Education as a subject for the baccalauréat (the general matriculation exams) in 2015. His next book, Le Tango, Passion du Corps et de l’Esprit, was published by Milan Presse in 2001.

According to historian Julio Nudler, Zalko was the first author to conduct a serious investigation on the development of the tango in Paris. Zalko is considered to be an expert in his field by tango researchers; his work, in particular, the book Paris-Buenos Aires: Un Siècle de Tango/ Paris-Buenos Aires: Un Siglo de Tango, has been cited in various books, articles, and theses.

In Paris, in conjunction with the Pompidou Center, Zalko led a series of tours of places having a connection to tango.

Zalko died in Paris in 2011 and was buried in Montparnasse Cemetery. His gravestone bears the inscription "Buenos Aires – Jerusalem – Paris", testifying to the major landmarks in his life and work. He was honoured by a tribute at the Argentine Embassy in Paris several months after his death.

Publications

Books 
 Crepusculo en La Habana [Twilight in Havana], Buenos Aires: Catalogos, 1993, .
 Paris – Buenos Aires, Un Siècle de Tango [Paris – Buenos Aires, One Hundred Years of Tango; French language edition], Paris: Du Félin, 1998, . Reprinted in 2004, . Reprinted in paperback in 2016, .
 Le Tango, Passion du Corps et de l’Esprit [Tango, Passion of the Body and the Spirit], Oban, France: Milan Presse, 2001, .
 Paris – Buenos Aires, Un Siglo de Tango [Paris – Buenos Aires, One Hundred Years of Tango; Spanish language edition], Buenos Aires: Corregidor, 2001, .

Group publications

 Bein Tze'irim: Sikhot be-Tzavta ba-Tnu'ah ha-Kibbutzit [Among Young People: Talks in the Kibbutz], Tel-Aviv: Union of Kvutzot and Kibbutzim/Am Oved, 1969.
 Le Sang du Printemps, Jérusalem 1967 [Spring of Blood, Jerusalem 1967], Les Temps Modernes, Mayenne, France, 2008, issue 651, pp. 53–64.
 Danses Latines [Latin Dances], Paris: Autrement, 2001
 Tango y Lunfardo [Tango and Lunfardo], Buenos Aires: Dunke, 2002,

CDs

 Paris – Buenos Aires, collection of tangos selected by Nardo Zalko. Paris: Du Félin, 1998, Ref. 935770–9.

Films about Zalko

 Paris le Tango Buenos Aires, director: Odile Fillion, 2007 
 Nardo Zalko. Paris – Buenos Aires. Un Siècle de Tango, director: Claude Namer and Manu Petit, 2010

Journalism
Correspondent in Israel for Marcha, Montevideo – 1961–1970
Correspondent in Paris for Marcha, Montevideo – 1970–1974
Reporter for Clarin, Buenos Aires; Mondo Nuevo, Caracas; La Vanguardia, Medellin; Amitiés France-Israel, Paris – 1974–1979
Reporter for El Universal and El Nacional, Mexico; El Herald, Miami; El Carabobeño, Valencia; El Tiempo, Bogota – 1980–1991
Editor-in-chief of the periodical Tango, Bulletin de l'Académie du Tango de France, Paris  – 1996

References

1941 births
2011 deaths
20th-century French journalists
Argentine journalists
Journalists from Buenos Aires
Argentine emigrants to France
Argentine people of Lithuanian-Jewish descent
Argentine Jews
History of dance
Israeli military personnel